Angelus Funeral Home is a funeral home in South Los Angeles, California.  It was listed as a Los Angeles Historic-Cultural Monument in 2006 and on the National Register of Historic Places in 2009.  In 1925, Angelus Funeral Home was the first Black-owned business to be incorporated in California.  The current building  on Crenshaw Boulevard  was designed by noted African-American architect Paul R. Williams in the 
Spanish Colonial and Georgian Revival styles and also includes Art Deco elements.

The building was deemed to satisfy the registration requirements set forth in a multiple property submission study, the African Americans in Los Angeles MPS.  Other sites listed pursuant to the same African Americans in Los Angeles MPS include the Second Baptist Church, Lincoln Theater, 28th Street YMCA, Prince Hall Masonic Temple, 52nd Place Historic District, 27th Street Historic District, and two historic all-Black segregated fire stations (Fire Station No. 14 and Fire Station No. 30).

See also

National Register of Historic Places listings in Los Angeles, California
List of Los Angeles Historic-Cultural Monuments in South Los Angeles
Angelus-Rosedale Cemetery

References

1925 establishments in California
Commercial buildings on the National Register of Historic Places in Los Angeles
Death care companies of the United States
South Los Angeles
Paul Williams (architect) buildings